Bellino Bertaldo (d. 26 November 1145) was an Italian Roman Catholic prelate who served as the Bishop of Padua from 1128 until his murder. Pope Eugene IV later canonized Bellino as a saint.

Biography
Bellino was born into the noble Bertaldi house in Padua.

Bellino opposed his bishop Milone because the latter adhered to Antipope Clement III but he remained dedicated to the legitimate popes during Milone's episcopal tenure. But he would support Bishop Sinibaldo since he remained dedicated to Pope Paschal II rather than the antipope. Bellino later embarked in 1144 on a pilgrimage to Rome to meet Pope Celestine II who was impressed upon meeting him that he named Bellino as the new Bishop of Padua. He defended the Church from secular threats and supported ecclesial rights and also led a reform for the diocesan canons and an effort to rebuild the cathedral after its destruction in an earthquake in 1117. He also oversaw the construction of schools.

He was travelling in a forest at Fratta (near Rovigo) en route to Rome when assassins stabbed him to death; the Capodivacca house hired these assassins to kill him for reasons unknown. Bellino's remains were housed in Lugarano at the church of San Giacomo but a flood prompted his relics to be moved to the new church of San Bellino in San Martino di Variano. The relics were moved into a chapel in the same church later in 1647.

References

External links
 Catholic Online

1145 deaths
12th-century Christian saints
12th-century Italian Roman Catholic bishops
12th-century venerated Christians
Bishops of Padua
Italian Roman Catholic saints
Venerated Catholics
Year of birth unknown